Internet Platinum is the eighth studio album and second mixtape by rapper Mr. Serv-on, released on May 31, 2011.

Track listing

 Internet Platinum Intro
 20 Bricks
 Dude
 Flight
 Walk Like Me
 This Is The South
 Sexxin U
 Late Night
 Shawty
 My Fi
 20 Bricks (Radio Version)
 Lone Star State
 Waiting
 Fly Like A Bird

References

2011 albums
Mr. Serv-On albums